The 1973 Tasman Series was a motor racing competition staged in New Zealand and Australia  for cars complying with the Tasman Formula. The series, which began on 6 January and ended on 25 February after eight races, was the tenth Tasman Series. Officially known as the Tasman Championship for Drivers, it was organised jointly by the Motorsport Association New Zealand Incorporated and the Confederation of Australian Motor Sport. The championship was won by Graham McRae, driving a McRae GM1 Chevrolet.

Races

The series was contested over eight rounds.

Points system 
Points were awarded at each race on the following basis:

All races were counted towards the final totals for each driver.

Series standings

References

External links
 Tasman Cup (F5000) races 1970-1975, www.oldracingcars.com

1973
Tasman Series
Tasman Series
Formula 5000